Iacob is a 1988 Romanian film  directed by Mircea Daneliuc and starring Dorel Vișan.
The latter was nominated for European Film Award for Best Actor.

Synopsis
Iacob (Dorel Vișan) is a gold miner who is involved in a risky profession to support his family. He cares for his wife, mother-in-law, and four children in this socio-political drama.

Cast 
Dorel Vișan as Iacob
Cecilia Bârbora as Veturia
Ion Fiscuteanu as Trifan
Maria Seleș as Aspasia
Livia Baba as Bătrâna
Dinu Apetrei as Ilie Roșu
Florin Zamfirescu	
Ion Besoiu	
Constantin Cotimanis	
Adrian Titieni as Inginerul
Valentin Uritescu

Awards
European Film Award for Best Actor - Dorel Vișan (nominated)

References

External links

1980s Romanian-language films
1988 films